E 017 is a European B class road in Russia, connecting the cities Yelabuga – Ufa.

Route 
:Yelabuga - Ufa

External links 
 UN Economic Commission for Europe: Overall Map of E-road Network (2007)

International E-road network
European routes in Russia